Maumee Downs was a horse racing track located in Maumee, Ohio, near the Ohio Turnpike. Opened in 1902 as  Lucas County Fairgrounds, then later renamed Fort Miami Fairgrounds, the facility gained national notoriety in 1929 when it became the first track in the country to install a lighting system and hold night sessions of harness racing.

The track was renamed Maumee Downs after a major renovation in 1958. However, competition from nearby tracks quickly led to its demise. Maumee held their final race in 1961 after the Ohio Racing Commission awarded their dates to other tracks, effectively prohibiting racing at Maumee.

The site is now the location of the Lucas County Recreation Center.

References

Defunct horse racing venues in the United States